Spanioptila spinosum is a moth of the family Gracillariidae. It is known from Cuba, Puerto Rico and Saint Thomas, U.S. Virgin Islands.

The larvae feed on Casearia hirsuta. They mine the leaves of their host plant.

References

Gracillariinae